A roadmap may refer to:

A road map, a form of map that details roads and transport links
A plan, e.g.
Road map for peace, to resolve the Israeli-Palestinian conflict
Technology roadmap, a management forecasting tool
Roadmap (book), a 2015 nonfiction book by Roadtrip Nation